The Trail of the Hawk: A Comedy of the Seriousness of Life is a 1915 novel by Sinclair Lewis.

Plot 

The story follows the life of Carl Ericson as he grows up and matures. He has to face the choice of either going to his town college, to a private school with a childhood friend, or live in the wilderness with his older friend, who had a cottage in the middle of the forest.

Reception

External links
 Digitized copies of The Trail of the Hawk at Internet Archive
 

1915 American novels
Novels by Sinclair Lewis
Harper & Brothers books